Viktor Semyonovich Abakumov (24 April 1908 – 19 December 1954) was a high-level Soviet security official from 1943 to 1946, the head of SMERSH in the USSR People's Commissariat of Defense, and from 1946 to 1951 Minister of State Security or MGB (ex-NKGB). He was removed from office and arrested in 1951 on fabricated charges of failing to investigate the Doctors' Plot. After the death of Joseph Stalin, Abakumov was tried for fabricating the Leningrad Affair, sentenced to death and executed in 1954.

Early life and career 

Abakumov was an ethnic Russian. Recent scholarship suggests that he was born in Moscow, though he was previously said to be from the Don Cossack region of south Russia. His father was an unskilled labourer and his mother a nurse. 

At the age of 14, Abakumov joined the Soviet Red Army in spring 1922 and served with the 2nd Special Task Moscow Brigade in the Russian Civil War until demobilization in December 1923. He then joined the Komsomol. He became a candidate member of the Communist Party in 1930, and worked in the People's Commissariat of Supplies until 1932, while being responsible for the Military Section of the Communist Youth League in the Moscow area (raion). 

In early 1932, recommended by the Party to join the security services (OGPU), he was assigned to the Economic Department and possibly to the Investigation Department. In 1933, he was dismissed from the Economic Department and assigned as an overseer to the GULAG. This was a clear demotion; Abakumov was a compulsive womanizer, and his superior, M.P. Shreider (ru), regarded Abakumov as unfit to be a Chekist.

Rise through NKVD ranks 

In 1934, after the reorganization of the security apparatus (the OGPU was joined to the NKVD as a GUGB), Abakumov started his work in a 1st Section of Economics Department (EKO) by the Main Directorate of State Security (GUGB) of NKVD. On 1 August 1934, he was transferred to the Chief Directorate of Camps and Labour Colonies (GULAG), where he served until 1937, mainly as an operative officer in the 3rd Section of Security Department of GULAG of the NKVD. In April 1937, Abakumov was moved to the 4th Department (OO) of GUGB of the NKVD where he served until March 1938.

After the next reorganization of NKVD structure in March 1938, he became assistant to the chief of the 4th Department in the 1st Directorate of the NKVD. From 29 September to 1 November 1938, he was an assistant to Pyotr Fedotov, the head of the 2nd Department (Secret Political Dep – or. SPO) of GUGB of the NKVD. Until the end of 1938, he worked in the SPO GUGB NKVD as a head of one of the sections. Abakumov survived the Great Purge by participating in it. He executed each order without scruple, probably saving him from facing an execution squad himself. Near the end of December 1938, Abakumov was moved from Moscow to Rostov-on-Don, where he became the head of the UNKVD of the Rostov Oblast (the head of the local NKVD Office).

World War II activities 

Abakumov returned to Moscow HQ on 12 February 1941 as a Senior Major of State Security and, after the reorganization and creation of the new NKGB, he became one of the deputies of Lavrentiy Beria, who was the People's Commissar for Internal Affairs (head of the NKVD). On 19 July 1941, he became the head of Special Department (OO) of the NKVD which was responsible for Counterintelligence and internal security in the RKKA (Red Army). 

In this position, after the attack of Nazi Germany on the Soviet Union and the defeats experienced by the Red Army, on Stalin's order he led the purges of RKKA commanders accused of betrayal and cowardice. In 1943, from 19 April to 20 May 1943, Abakumov was one of Stalin’s deputies, when he held the post of People's Commissar of Defence of the USSR.

In April 1943, when Chief Counterintelligence Directorate of the People's Commissariat of Defence of the USSR  (or GUKR NKO USSR) better known as SMERSH was created, Abakumov was put in charge of it, in the rank of Commissar (2nd rank) of State Security, and held the title of vice-Commissar of Defense.

During the war, he reported directly to Joseph Stalin, and appears to have been able to bypass Beria. For example, Beria disclaimed responsibility for the arrest in 1941 of the Red Army Marshal, Kirill Meretskov, for which he blamed Stalin and Abakumov. However, Nikita Khrushchev – who later denounced Stalin and had both Beria and Abakumov executed – did not believe him. He claimed that Stalin "thought he had found in Abakumov a bright young man who was dutifully carrying out his orders, but actually Abakumov was reporting to Stalin what Beria had told him Stalin wanted to hear". 

He used his position to enrich himself. He took over a 'splendid' apartment, whose previous occupant, a soprano, he had arrested, and "stashed his mistresses in the Moskva Hotel and imported trainloads of plunder from Berlin."

Head of MGB 

In 1946, Stalin appointed Abakumov Minister of State Security (MGB). Although the ministry was under the general supervision of Beria, Stalin hoped to curb the latter's power. Beria was said by Vsevolod Merkulov to be "scared to death of Abakumov" and tried to "have good relations" with him.  In his capacity in the MGB he was in charge of the 1949 purge known as the "Leningrad Affair," in which the Politburo members Nikolai Voznesensky and Aleksei Kuznetsov were executed.

He also carried out the early stages of the anti-semitic campaign that Stalin ordered, as the second pro-Arab phase of Stalin's Middle East plans following the enormous military support he had given to help establish the state of Israel, involving the arrest and torture of numerous prominent Jews, including an Old Bolshevik, Solomon Lozovsky. 

When the eminent scientist, Lina Stern, was arrested and brought before Abakumov, he shouted at her, accusing her of being a Zionist and of plotting to turn the Crimea in a separate Jewish state. When she denied the accusation, he shouted: "Why you old whore!" Stern replied: "So that's the way a minister talks to an academician."

Arrest and execution 

In June 1951, Abakumov's deputy, Mikhail Ryumin, wrote to Stalin alleging that Abakumov was not doing enough to fabricate a case against the Jews. Ryumin's brainchild was the Doctors' Plot. Abakumov and several other senior MGB officers were arrested. In March 1953 Stalin died, Beria regained control of the police, and Ryumin was arrested. Beria and Ryumin were arrested and shot, but Abakumov and his associates remained in prison.

Abakumov and five others were brought to a six day trial in December 1954, accused of falsifying the 'Leningrad Affair'. Abakumov and three former deputy heads of the MGB Section for Investigating Specially Important Cases, A.G. Leonov, V.I. Komarov and M.T. Likhachev, were sentenced to death and shot after the trial ended on 19 December. Col Likhachev was based successively in Poland, Hungary, and Czechoslovakia in 1945–49 and had played a role in preparing the Rajk and Slansky show trials, though this role was not part of the case against him.

Two others, Ya.M. Broverman and I.A. Chernov were sentenced, respectively, to 25 years and 15 years in the GULAG. In 1970, it was reported that Broverman was enjoying a relatively privileged position as a trustee in a labour camp.

Awards
Abakumov was deprived of all titles and awards on November 14, 1955.

In literature and film 

Abakumov is portrayed as a cunning courtier, not altogether trusted by Stalin, in Aleksandr Solzhenitsyn's novel, The First Circle. In the 1992 film version of the book, he was played by Christopher Plummer and in a Russian language mini-series broadcast in 2006, he was played by Roman Madyanov. There is another fictional portrayal of him in the novel Dust and Ashes by Anatoly Rybakov. In Solzhenitsyn's famous non-fiction text, The Gulag Archipelago, he accused Abakumov of personally engaging in the beatings and torture of prisoners during interrogations.

References

1908 births
1954 deaths
Executed people from Moscow
NKVD officers
People from Moskovsky Uyezd
Communist Party of the Soviet Union members
People's commissars and ministers of the Soviet Union
Second convocation members of the Soviet of the Union
Soviet colonel generals
Commissars 2nd Class of State Security
KGB officers
Recipients of the Order of the Red Banner
Recipients of the Order of Suvorov, 1st class
Recipients of the Order of Kutuzov, 1st class
Recipients of the Order of Suvorov, 2nd class
Recipients of the Order of the Red Star
Expelled members of the Communist Party of the Soviet Union
Police officers convicted of treason
Inmates of Lefortovo Prison
Executed Soviet people from Russia
Russian people executed by the Soviet Union
Members of the Communist Party of the Soviet Union executed by the Soviet Union
People executed for treason against the Soviet Union
People executed by the Soviet Union by firearm